Allan David Dick  (1 September 1915 – 15 March 1992) was a New Zealand politician of the National Party.

Biography

Dick was born in 1915 at Dunedin. He received his education at Otago Boys' High School.  After school, he farmed at North Otago, Kurow and then Lilybank Station at the head of Lake Tekapo in the McKenzie Country. He bought Lilybank in 1937.

He was one of six candidates for the National nomination in this largely rural and safe National seat. He was one of four National Party incumbents from Otago and Southland who lost their normally blue electorate to the Labour challenger over the proposed raising of the lake levels of lakes Manapouri and Te Anau, which was opposed by the Save Manapouri campaign. Labour's election manifesto was for the lakes to remain at their natural levels.

Dick held various positions outside parliament. He was a foundation member of the Mount Cook National Park Board. For a time, he chaired the Tekapo Town Planning Committee, and he was a chairman of the Waitaki Lakes Committee. He was chairman of the Mackenzie branch of Federated Farmers. He was appointed a Companion of the Queen's Service Order for community service in the 1981 Queen's Birthday Honours, and was awarded the New Zealand 1990 Commemoration Medal in 1990.

Dick died in Oamaru on 15 March 1992. His wife, Betty Dick, wrote a book High Country Family (Reed, Wellington, 1964) about their life on Lilybank Station, and the changes when he became an MP. They had four sons and one daughter.

Notes

References

|- 

1915 births
1992 deaths
New Zealand National Party MPs
New Zealand farmers
Members of the New Zealand House of Representatives
New Zealand MPs for South Island electorates
Politicians from Dunedin
People educated at Otago Boys' High School
Companions of the Queen's Service Order
Unsuccessful candidates in the 1972 New Zealand general election